Macquarie Fields High School (abbreviated as MFHS) is a government-funded co-educational dual modality partially academically selective and comprehensive secondary day school, located in Macquarie Fields, a south-western suburb of Sydney, New South Wales, Australia.

Established in 1981, Macquarie Fields High School caters for approximately 1,000 students from Year 7 to Year 12. The school is administered by the New South Wales Department of Education and has two avenues for admission and runs two streams of classes: "Selective", in which students are accepted after sitting a statewide competitive entrance examination, and "Community", in which students are allowed to reside in the local community.

History 
The school began operating at the current site in 1981. It was originally set up as a temporary school in demountable accommodation, to provide for the growing number of students between James Meehan High School and Ingleburn High School during the 1980s. The parents fought hard to establish a permanent school on the site and eventually were successful in achieving their goal. The first Year 12 group was educated in demountables.

The first Principal was Don Harwin and his Deputy was Mike Wilson. Harwin began in 1981 with approximately fourteen staff members and was appointed to Menai High School in 1988 with Mike Wilson as the Deputy Principal.

The permanent school building was completed in 1987 and the new buildings were fully occupied for one term before the end of that year. The hall/gymnasium is the oldest building at the present site.

During most of its early history, the school catered for students with a wide range of abilities and socio-economic backgrounds. The school was funded by the Disadvantaged Schools Program until the end of 1989. During 1988, the school was targeted to become one of a number of new Selective High Schools that were to be established the following year. The school was chosen because of its strategic location in relation to transport and also because the two other High Schools were in such close proximity.

Since 1989, the school has had a mixed mode intake of selective and community students. In 1994, in response to parents concerns about an imbalance between the number of selective and community students in Year 7 intakes the Department of School Education established a special committee of review to determine the future composition of the student body. The recommendation of the review committee was that the school would continue in the mixed mode for the foreseeable future. Each Year 7 intake is to have a maximum of 90 selective and 90 community students. Though, the school has introduced a Special Education unit of three classes (Gold, Green and Blue), also the number of community students has also risen leading to the introduction of a fourth class within the community stream rather than the conventional 3. This has created mass problems with congestion and space within the school, due to its small size it was designed to cater for only 900 kids. But due to a growing number of residents in Macquarie Fields and increase in demand the school has allowed record numbers of students for enrolment. This lack of space and boom in community students has made the rankings of the school go lower consecutively each year, thus forcing a review into the school's capacity. Since 2010 there has been strong debate to whether the school should become fully selective and make community students go to nearby schools with low numbers such as James Meehan and Ingleburn, however, none of these suggestions have ever been accepted.

Extracurricular activities

Future Teacher's Club
This initiative allows students to experience first-hand teaching. Students plan and teach lessons to younger grades during 'Teach Week'. Additionally club-members participate with annual visits to University of Sydney, allowing them to partake in insightful discussions and activities with current university students studying secondary education. The initiative has been successful as Australia's first Future Teacher's Club; currently occupying over 50 club-members.

Campus
The school is situated on Harold Street in Macquarie Fields, a suburb of South-Western Sydney. The school features many gardens named after the school's many achievements and notable people including:
Yellow Ribbon Grove: A looped road branched off from Harold Street leading into the school reflecting the Yellow Ribbon program in which senior students are trained as support people and points of contact for junior students.
Robbyn Kidd Grove: Dedicated to a notable former principal of the school and for her contributions to the school.

Hall
Refurbished following an arson attack in 2009, in which the hall was gutted and left standing as an unused hollow shell, provides a multipurpose indoor space for special events such as Half Yearly, Yearly, School Certificate and Higher School Certificate Examinations and special assemblies. The hall is the headquarters of the Physical, Development and Health department, and features changing rooms and shower blocks. The hall also features a state of the art P.A. system.

Agricultural plot
Though small, it is an established part of the school.
There are two permanent resident geese, named Van Gogh and Picasso.

Students
There are currently approximately 1030 students enrolled through Years 7 to 12. Macquarie Fields High School is both a community and academically selective high school; admission to Macquarie Fields in Year 7 is by a government examination, the Selective High Schools Test, which is open to all Year 6 students in NSW or opened to students living in the Macquarie Fields student catchment area. A small number of students from other high schools are accepted into years 8 to 11, with application made directly to the school. Of the student population, over 72% are from a non-English-speaking background, predominantly Vietnamese (35.7%), Chinese (26.9%), Bangladeshi (16.3%), Indian (10.2%), Filipino (4.4%), Arabic (4%).

Centre of Excellence
In 2009, Macquarie Fields High School was selected as one of thirteen primary and secondary schools around the state to become Centres for Excellence. The school will receive extra resources, and be linked to a university which will be able to send its teaching students to the school at any time during their course rather than the traditional internship.

Notable alumni 
Alyson Annan - Olympic hockey player
Simon Dwyer - former professional rugby league football player
Michael De Vere - former professional rugby league footballer
Brett Emerton - international Australian soccer player
Shayne McMenemy - former professional rugby league football player
Prince Mak - former member of Korean idol group, JJCC
L-FRESH the Lion - Australian hip hop artist

See also

List of government schools in New South Wales
List of selective high schools in New South Wales

References

External links 
 Macquarie Fields High School website

Public high schools in Sydney
Selective schools in New South Wales
Educational institutions established in 1981
1981 establishments in Australia
Macquarie Fields, New South Wales